The following is a list of notable deaths in February 2018.

Entries for each day are listed alphabetically by surname. A typical entry lists information in the following sequence:
 Name, age, country of citizenship at birth, subsequent country of citizenship (if applicable), reason for notability, cause of death (if known), and reference.

February 2018

1
Omar Aggad, 90, Palestinian-born Saudi Arabian investor and philanthropist.
Haji Saifullah Khan Bangash, 70, Pakistani politician, Senator (since 2012), heart failure.
John Battaglia, 62, American convicted murderer, execution by lethal injection.
André Baudry, 95, French magazine editor (Arcadie).
Niranjan Bhagat, 91, Indian poet, stroke.
Hazar Khan Bijarani, 71, Pakistani politician, MP (1990–1993, 1997–2013), shot.
Cliff Bourland, 97, American sprinter, Olympic champion (1948), complications from pneumonia.
Fidel Castro Díaz-Balart, 68, Cuban nuclear physicist and scientific adviser, suicide.
Dino Cinel, 76, Italian-American priest and historian, stabbed.
Dennis Edwards, 74, American Hall of Fame soul and R&B singer (The Contours, The Temptations), complications from meningitis.
Édouard Ferrand, 52, French politician, MEP (since 2014).
Sonia Gechtoff, 91, American painter.
Germain Grisez, 88, French-American philosopher.
Nicholas von Hoffman, 88, American journalist.
Barys Kit, 107, Belarusian rocket scientist.
Robert Larsson, 50, Swedish ice hockey player (Skellefteå AIK), complications from a heart attack.
Li Kelin, 75, Chinese container transport executive (China Shipping Group).
John Jacob Lavranos, 91, South African insurance broker and botanist.
Patricia Lindop, 87, British radiation biologist.
Michael O'Hara, 85, American Olympic volleyball player (1964), Pan-American Games champion (1959).
Frank L. Oliver, 95, American politician, member of the Pennsylvania House of Representatives (1973–2010).
Mowzey Radio, 33, Ugandan singer (Goodlyfe Crew), head injury.
Fariha Razzaq Haroon, 61–62, Pakistani politician, shot.
Sewall Shurtz, 84, American Olympic fencer (1956).
Palle Sørensen, 90, Danish convicted murderer.
Alan Stout, 85, American composer.
Su Bai, 95, Chinese archaeologist.
William Whitehead, 86, Canadian writer.

2
Boaz Arad, 61, Israeli artist, suicide by hanging.
Dave Barrett, 87, Canadian politician, Premier of British Columbia (1972–1975), Alzheimer's disease.
Carlo Brugnami, 79, Italian racing cyclist.
Sanford Diller, 89, American real estate developer and philanthropist.
Derek Freeman, 93, Australian politician, member of the New South Wales Legislative Council (1973–1981, 1981–1984).
Albina Girfanova, 61, Russian linguist and anthropologist.
Tomás Gutiérrez, 77, Puerto Rican basketball player (Leones de Ponce).
Jon Huntsman Sr., 80, American chemical manufacturer and philanthropist, prostate cancer.
Malcolm Jefferson, 71, British racehorse trainer.
Paulo Roberto Morais Júnior, 33, Brazilian footballer (Incheon United, Al-Fujairah), leukemia.
Alan Maynard, 73, British health economist.
Durk van der Mei, 93, Dutch politician, Secretary of State (1977–1981).
Kingunge Ngombale–Mwiru, 87, Tanzanian politician, MP (2000–2010).
Fábio Pereira de Azevedo, 41, Brazilian-born Togolese footballer (A.D. Isidro Metapán), traffic collision.
Joseph Polchinski, 63, American theoretical physicist, cancer.
Ole Thestrup, 69, Danish actor (Borgen, The Green Butchers, Ronal Barbaren), lung cancer.
Melvyn Weiss, 82, American attorney, complications from amyotrophic lateral sclerosis.

3
Bert Brown, 79, Canadian politician, Senator (2007–2013).
Sam Cataldo, 80, American politician, member of the New Hampshire Senate (2012–2016), traffic collision.
Leon "Ndugu" Chancler, 65, American jazz/pop drummer ("Billie Jean"), prostate cancer.
Pierre Conner, 85, American mathematician.
Ted Corbett, 94, New Zealand organic chemist (University of Otago).
Roy Dietzel, 87, American baseball player (Washington Senators).
Roman Filipov, 33, Russian fighter pilot, suicide by grenade explosion.
Michael Gordon, 62, Australian journalist (The Age), heart attack.
Michael Harner, 88, American anthropologist and author.
Lakshmi Kanakala, 78, Indian actress, cardiac arrest.
Federico Leardini, 38, Italian economic journalist, heart attack.
Oswaldo Loureiro, 85, Brazilian actor.
Bert Lundin, 96, Swedish union leader.
Károly Palotai, 82, Hungarian football player and referee, Olympic champion (1964).
Ilse Petri, 99, German actress.
Dirk Bernard Joseph Schouten, 95, Dutch economist.
Alec Sehon, 93, Romanian-born Canadian immunologist.
George Shadid, 88, American politician, member of the Illinois Senate (1993–2006).
Hukum Singh, 79, Indian politician, MP (since 2014).
Bill Teale, 70, American educator.
Rolf Zacher, 76, German actor (Jaider, der einsame Jäger, Angelo und Luzy, Rising to the Bait).

4
Frank Allen, 91, Australian footballer (East Perth, Western Australia), cancer.
Zvi Arad, 75, Israeli mathematician.
Majid Ariff, 80, Singaporean football player and coach.
Alan Baker, 78, British mathematician, recipient of the Fields Medal (1970), stroke.
Etelka Barsi-Pataky, 76, Hungarian politician, MEP (2004–2009).
Don Choate, 79, American baseball player (San Francisco Giants), cancer.
Jack Davis, 82, American politician, member of the U.S. House of Representatives (1987–1989), dementia.
Nicholas Dopuch, 88, American accounting researcher.
Gregor Dorfmeister, 88, German writer and journalist (Die Brücke, Town Without Pity).
Martin Grüner, 88, German politician.
Kenneth Haigh, 86, British actor (Man at the Top, Cleopatra, Eagle in a Cage).
*Hoàng Vân, 87, Vietnamese songwriter.
Takuya Iwasaki, 88, Japanese Middle Eastern archaeologist and professor (University of Tsukuba).
Edwin Jackson, 26, American football player (Indianapolis Colts, Arizona Cardinals), traffic collision.
John Mahoney, 77, English-American actor (Frasier, In the Line of Fire, Say Anything...), Tony winner (1986), complications from throat cancer.
Esmond Bradley Martin, 76, American conservationist, stabbed.
Nat Neujean, 95, Belgian sculptor.
Séamus Pattison, 81, Irish politician, TD (1961–2007), Parkinson's disease.
Laurin Pepper, 88, American football and baseball player (Southern Miss Golden Eagles, Pittsburgh Pirates).
Wojciech Pokora, 83, Polish actor.
Leif Rygg, 77, Norwegian fiddler, cancer.
Irina Sanpiter, 60, Russian actress (Bianco, rosso e Verdone), leukemia.
Jim Stillwagon, 68, American football player (Ohio State Buckeyes, Toronto Argonauts).
T. Varagunam, 87, Sri Lankan academic and physician.

5
John Agitation, 90, Trinidadian comedian.
Siddiq Baloch, 77, Pakistani journalist and political economist, pancreatic cancer.
Caroline Brown, 64, British cellist (Hanover Band), Krukenberg tumor.
Chien Te-men, 74, Taiwanese actor.
Richard Doughty, 57, English cricketer (Gloucestershire).
Margot Duhalde, 97, Chilean pilot (Air Transport Auxiliary).
Dovid Grossman, 71, American rabbi, traffic collision.
Ladislav Kačáni, 86, Slovak football player and coach.
Yoshihide Kozai, 89, Japanese astronomer, liver failure.
Ken McPherson, 90, English footballer (Coventry City, Newport County, Swindon Town).
Bob Morrow, 71, Canadian politician, Mayor of Hamilton, Ontario (1982–2000).
Jeremy Nunley, 46, American football player (Houston Oilers, Carolina Panthers), heart attack.
Seán O'Connor, 82, Irish hurler (Limerick GAA) and referee.
Domingo Pillado, 90, Chilean Olympic footballer (1952).
Mathieu Riboulet, 57, French writer and film director, cancer.
Francisco Rojas San Román, 59, Mexican trucker, motivational coach and politician, MP (2009–2012, since 2015), shot.
Zeno Roth, 61, German guitarist and songwriter (Uli Jon Roth).
Sushma Shimkhada, 82, Nepali sculptor.
Jockie Soerjoprajogo, 63, Indonesian musician and songwriter, complications from diabetes, cirrhosis and stroke.
Ove Stokstad, 78, Norwegian artist and jazz musician.
Hugh Wirth, 78, Australian veterinarian and animal welfare advocate.
Norman Zabusky, 89, American physicist.

6
Fedora Alemán, 105, Venezuelan singer (Virginia).
Aljabr, 22, American racehorse, heart attack.
Liliana Bodoc, 59, Argentine author (La Saga de los Confines), heart attack.
Douglas Botting, 83, English explorer and author.
Bernard Darmet, 72, French Olympic racing cyclist (1968).
Doug Guetzloe, 63, American political consultant.
André Harvey, 75, American sculptor.
Jao Tsung-I, 100, Chinese-born Hong Kong scholar, calligrapher and painter.
Joe Knollenberg, 84, American politician, member of the U.S. House of Representatives (1993–2009), Alzheimer's disease.
Donald Lynden-Bell, 82, English astrophysicist, complications from a stroke.
Muhiyidin Moye, 32, American political activist (Black Lives Matter), shot.
Madavoor Vasudevan Nair, 88, Indian Kathakali dancer.
Débora Pérez Volpin, 50, Argentine journalist and politician, member of the Buenos Aires City Legislature (since 2017), cardiac arrest.
Joseph Roman, 94, American actor (Quincy, M.E., Bugsy, Murphy's Law).
James W. Sire, 84, American author.
Brunello Spinelli, 78, Italian water polo player, Olympic champion (1960), traffic collision.
Frida Topno, 92, Indian politician.
John Anthony West, 85, American author and Egyptologist, cancer.
Michael White, 58, British author and musician (Thompson Twins).

7
Brahim Akhiat, 77, Moroccan author.
John Perry Barlow, 70, American writer, lyricist (Grateful Dead) and internet activist, co-founder of Electronic Frontier Foundation.
Nelson Cooke, 98, Australian cellist (London Symphony Orchestra, Royal Philharmonic Orchestra) and teacher (Canberra School of Music).
Torsten Engberg, 83, Swedish military officer.
Johny Hoffmann, 73, Luxembourgian footballer.
Mickey Jones, 76, American drummer (Kenny Rogers and The First Edition) and actor (Home Improvement, National Lampoon's Vacation), complications from diabetes.
Waltraud Kretzschmar, 70, East German handball player (national team), world champion (1971, 1975, 1978), Olympic silver (1976) and bronze medalist (1980).
T. N. Krishnamurti, 85, Indian meteorologist.
Ralph Lumenti, 81, American baseball player (Washington Senators).
Jill Messick, 50, American film producer (Mean Girls, Frida) and talent manager (Rose McGowan), suicide.
Newton Morton, 88, American epidemiologist.
Herman Ferdinandus Maria Münninghoff, 96, Dutch Roman Catholic prelate, Bishop of Jayapura (1972–1997), cancer.
Gali Muddu Krishnama Naidu, 70, Indian politician, dengue fever.
Valerii Postoyanov, 76, Russian Olympic sport shooter (1972).
Nabi Şensoy, 72, Turkish diplomat, ambassador to the United States (2006–2009).
Pat Torpey, 64, American drummer (Mr. Big), complications from Parkinson's disease.
Skule Waksvik, 90, Norwegian sculptor.
Catherine G. Wolf, 70, American psychologist, complications from amyotrophic lateral sclerosis.

8
Ben Agajanian, 98, American football player (New York Giants, Green Bay Packers), NFL Champion (1956, 1961).
Zarnigar Agakisiyeva, 72, Azerbaijani actress, heart failure.
Jarrod Bannister, 33, Australian Olympic javelin thrower (2008, 2012), Commonwealth Games champion (2010).
Carl K. Benhase, 88, American football coach (Hanover Panthers).
Verena Butalikakis, 62, German politician, deputy (2002–2005).
Paul Danblon, 86, Belgian journalist and composer.
Agenor Girardi, 66, Brazilian Roman Catholic prelate, Bishop of União da Vitória (since 2015).
Robert A. Gross, 90, American physicist and engineering scientist.
Marie Gruber, 62, German actress (Go Trabi Go, The Lives of Others, The Reader), lung cancer.
Don Hart, 87, Australian football player (Fitzroy).
Algia Mae Hinton, 88, American blues singer and guitarist.
M. Cecil Mackey, 89, American academic administrator, President of Michigan State University (1979–1985).
John Martinkovic, 91, American football player (Green Bay Packers, New York Giants).
Khalid Mehsud, 44, Pakistani terrorist, drone strike.
Ebony Reigns, 20, Ghanaian singer, traffic collision.
Carlos Robles Piquer, 92, Spanish diplomat and politician, Minister of Education and Science (1975–1976), Senator (1983–1987) and MEP (1986–1999).
Gary Seear, 65, New Zealand rugby union player (Otago, New Zealand Colts, national team), cancer.
Kavous Seyed-Emami, 64, Iranian environmentalist, suicide by hanging.
Lovebug Starski, 57, American rapper and disc jockey, heart attack.
Sandra L. Townes, 73, American judge (United States District Court for the Eastern District of New York), cancer.

9
Ray Baum, 62, American politician, lawyer and lobbyist (NAB), member of the Oregon House of Representatives (1988–1996), cancer.
Peter Beer, 89, American judge (Eastern District of Louisiana).
Reg E. Cathey, 59, American actor (The Wire, House of Cards, Fantastic Four), Emmy winner (2015), lung cancer.
Michael Crouch, 84, Australian investor and water boiler manufacturer (Zip Industries).
Dolores Crow, 86, American politician and legislator, member of the Idaho House of Representatives (1982–2006).
Antoine Culioli, 93, French linguist.
Serge Daan, 77, Dutch zoologist.
Jim Garrett, 87, American football player (BC Lions), coach (Columbia Lions) and scout (Dallas Cowboys).
John Gavin, 86, American actor (Psycho, Spartacus, Imitation of Life) and diplomat, Ambassador to Mexico (1981–1986), pneumonia.
Nebojša Glogovac, 48, Serbian actor (Klopka), cancer.
István Hevesi, 86, Hungarian water polo player, Olympic champion (1956).
Jóhann Jóhannsson, 48, Icelandic film composer (The Theory of Everything, Arrival, Sicario), accidental cocaine overdose.
Bernard Koura, 94, French painter.
Mordechai E. Kreinin, 88, Israeli-born American economist.
Alfonso Lacadena, 53, Spanish Mesoamerican epigraphist and academic (Complutense University of Madrid), cancer.
Robert W. Lichtwardt, 93, Brazilian-born American mycologist.
Craig MacGregor, 68, American bass guitarist (Foghat), lung cancer.
Neill McGeachy, 75, American college basketball coach (Duke University) and athletic director (Lenoir–Rhyne University).
Liam Miller, 36, Irish footballer (Manchester United, Sunderland, national team), pancreatic cancer.
Wally Moon, 87, American baseball player (St. Louis Cardinals, Los Angeles Dodgers), World Series champion (1959, 1963, 1965).
Henryk Niedźwiedzki, 84, Polish boxer, Olympic bronze medalist (1956).
"Sunshine" Sonny Payne, 92, American radio presenter (KFFA).
Edward Pearce, 78, English political journalist and writer.
Bruno Rossetti, 57, Italian sport shooter, Olympic bronze medalist (1992).
Anne Treisman, 82, British psychologist.
Edward Vebell, 96, American Olympic fencer (1952) and illustrator.
Keith M. Wilson, 73, British historian.

10
Advent Bangun, 66, Indonesian karateka and actor (The Devil's Sword), diabetes.
Sir Alan Battersby, 92, British organic chemist.
Jeff Bell, 74, American political consultant, presidential speechwriter and politician.
Fran Bera, 93, American aviator.
Troy Blakely, 68, American music executive and talent manager (Sammy Hagar, Red Hot Chili Peppers, Poison), cancer.
Tina Louise Bomberry, 52, Canadian Mohawk actress (North of 60).
Walter Boucquet, 76, Belgian racing cyclist.
Sir Lawrence Byford, 92, British police officer and author, Chief Inspector of Constabulary (1983–1987).
Bevan Congdon, 79, New Zealand cricketer (Central Districts, Canterbury, national team).
Rosa Ferrer Obiols, 57, Andorran politician, MP (1994–2001, 2005–2007), Mayor of Andorra la Vella (2007–2015) and Minister of Health, Welfare and Occupation (2015–2016), cancer.
Michiko Ishimure, 90, Japanese writer, complications from Parkinson's disease.
Raimund Herincx, 90, British bass-baritone.
Tamio Kawachi, 79, Japanese actor (Story of a Prostitute, Tokyo Drifter, Gappa: The Triphibian Monster), cerebral infarction.
Richard C. Lamb, 84, American astrophysicist.
Stephen A. Mahin, 71, American structural engineer.
Donald Mark, 91, American judge (New York Supreme Court).
William Merriweather Peña, 99, American architect.
John Muir, 73, Australian judge.
Myroslav Popovych, 87, Ukrainian philosopher.
Ludmila Švédová, 81, Czech gymnast, Olympic silver medalist (1960).
Chris Stockwell, 60, Canadian politician, Ontario MPP (1990–2003) and Speaker (1996–1999), cancer.
V. Joseph Thomas, 76, Indian police chief.
Peter Thonemann, 100, Australian-born British physicist.
Calvin Edouard Ward, 92, American concert pianist.

11
Anthony Acevedo, 93, American soldier and diarist.
Darien Boswell, 79, New Zealand Olympic rower (1964).
Sister Claire SMMI, 81, Indian Roman Catholic nun and artist.
Michael Cohen, 80, American physician and anthropologist, pneumonia.
Vic Damone, 89, American pop singer ("On the Street Where You Live", "You're Breaking My Heart"), complications from respiratory illness.
Ramendra Narayan Debbarma, 68, Indian politician, MLA (since 2013), stroke.
Jon D. Fox, 70, American politician, member of the U.S. House of Representatives (1995–1999), cancer.
Parbati Ghose, 84, Indian actress and film director, first female filmmaker from Odisha.
Asma Jahangir, 66, Pakistani human rights activist and lawyer, President of SCBAP (2010–2012) and Special Rapporteur on Human Rights in Iran (since 2016), heart attack.
Lâm Ngươn Tánh, 89, Vietnamese military officer.
Joseph MacNeil, 93, Canadian Roman Catholic prelate, Bishop of Saint John (1969–1973), Archbishop of Edmonton (1973–1999).
Jan Maxwell, 61, American actress and singer (Chitty Chitty Bang Bang, Follies, Gossip Girl), meningitis complicated from breast cancer.
Des Moroney, 82, Canadian-born Swedish ice hockey player and coach (Leksand, Västerås, Örebro).
Juozas Preikšas, 91, Lithuanian Roman Catholic prelate, Bishop of Panevėžys (1989–2002).
Tom Rapp, 70, American singer-songwriter (Pearls Before Swine), cancer.
Jean Renaux, 84, French Olympic sports shooter (1960, 1964).
Andy Rice, 77, American football player (Kansas City Chiefs, Cincinnati Bengals, Chicago Bears).
Dick Scott, 76, English footballer (Norwich City F. C.).
John Nanzip Shagaya, 75, Nigerian politician, Minister of Internal Affairs (1985–1990), traffic collision.
Sir Nicholas Shehadie, 92, Australian rugby union player (Randwick, New South Wales, national team), Lord Mayor of Sydney (1973–1975).
Sun Shu, 84, Chinese geologist, Director of the Institute of Geology, Chinese Academy of Sciences.
Raymond Vautherin, 82, French-born Italian linguist.
Qazi Wajid, 87, Pakistani actor (Ankahi, Tanhaiyaan, Dhoop Kinare) and radio personality, heart attack.

12
Marty Allen, 95, American actor and comedian (Allen & Rossi), complications from pneumonia.
Mohammed Amin, 89, Indian politician and trade unionist.
Weems Oliver Baskin III, 81, American politician, member of the South Carolina House of Representatives (1972–1974).
Jean-Jacques Béchio, 68, Ivorian politician.
Martin van der Borgh, 83, Dutch racing cyclist.
Dave Clark, 81, American Olympic pole vaulter (1960), cancer.
Bill Crider, 76, American author, cancer.
Leo Falcam, 82, Micronesian politician, President of the Federated States of Micronesia (1999–2003), Vice President (1997–1999), Governor of Pohnpei (1979–1983).
Giuseppe Galasso, 88, Italian historian and politician, Deputy (1983–1994).
Jef Geys, 83, Belgian artist.
Luo Haocai, 83, Chinese politician and legal scholar, chairman of China Zhi Gong Party.
Abdul Manan Ismail, 69, Malaysian politician, fall.
Louise Latham, 95, American actress (Marnie).
Jack Ludwig, 95, Canadian author.
Ursula Marvin, 96, American planetary geologist.
Grant McBride, 68, Australian politician, member of the Parliament of New South Wales (1992–2011), Alzheimer's disease.
László Melis, 64, Hungarian composer and violinist.
Alexander B. Morrison, 87, American religious leader, general authority of the LDS Church (since 1987).
Fethia Mzali, 90, Tunisian politician, country's first female government minister.
Gerald Reaven, 89, American endocrinologist.
Rudy Regalado, 87, American baseball player (Cleveland Indians).
Daryle Singletary, 46, American country music singer ("I Let Her Lie", "The Note", "Amen Kind of Love").
Mogau Tshehla, 26, South African footballer (Witbank Spurs, Polokwane City), traffic collision.
Françoise Xenakis, 87, French writer.

13
Edward M. Abroms, 82, American film editor (Blue Thunder, The Sugarland Express, Street Fighter), heart failure.
Joseph Bonnel, 79, French footballer (Marseille, national team).
Scott Boyer, 70, American singer, songwriter and musician (Cowboy, The 31st of February).
Carriega, 88, Spanish football coach (Real Zaragoza, Sevilla, Atlético Madrid).
Chyskillz, 48, American hip hop producer.
Danilinho, 32, Brazilian footballer (Chapecoense, Juazeirense), heart attack.
Florin Diacu, 58, Romanian-born Canadian mathematician.
Dobri Dobrev, 103, Bulgarian ascetic and philanthropist.
Tito Francona, 84, American baseball player (Cleveland Indians, Atlanta Braves, Baltimore Orioles).
Ernest Hecht, 88, Czechoslovakian-born British publisher.
Henrik, Prince Consort of Denmark, 83, French-born Danish royal consort (since 1972), complications from pneumonia.
Sandra Love, 72, American politician, member of the New Jersey General Assembly (2008–2010).
Victor Milán, 63, American author (Wild Cards, Deathlands, BattleTech), cancer.
Geir Magnus Nyborg, 66, Norwegian theologian.
Danko Radić, 65, Croatian basketball referee and coach.
Carmela Rey, 86, Mexican singer and actress.
John Robb, 85, Northern Irish politician and surgeon.
Josefina Samper, 90, Spanish syndicalist, communist and feminist.
George P. Steele, 93, American military officer.
Nini Theilade, 102, Danish ballet dancer and choreographer (A Midsummer Night's Dream, Ballet Russe de Monte Carlo).
Peter Daniel Truman, 83, American politician, member of the Pennsylvania House of Representatives (1983–1988).
John Turnbull, 82, New Zealand cricketer.

14
Zoltán Agócs, 79, Slovakian architect (Apollo Bridge).
Abolfazl Anvari, 80, Iranian Olympic wrestler (1968, 1972), world championship bronze medalist (1966, 1969).
Lois Barker, 94, American baseball player (AAGPBL).
Lev Bayandin, 76, Russian politician, Governor of Yamalo-Nenets Autonomous Okrug (1991–1994).
Lerone Bennett Jr., 89, American scholar and author, editor of Ebony, vascular dementia.
Angus Black, 92, Scottish rugby player (Lions, national team).
Pyotr Bochek, 92, Ukrainian military officer, Hero of the Soviet Union (1945).
Don Carter, 84, American investor, founding owner of the Dallas Mavericks.
Marty Dolin, 78, American-born Canadian politician, Manitoba MLA for Kildonan (1985–1988).
Claes Elmstedt, 89, Swedish politician, MP (1965–1984), Minister for Communications (1981–1982).
Nuray Hafiftaş, 53, Turkish folk singer.
Billy Henderson, 89, American football coach (Clarke Central).
Walter W. Holland, 88, Czech-born British epidemiologist.
Antoni Krauze, 78, Polish screenwriter and director.
Jörg Kuebart, 83, German military officer.
Ruud Lubbers, 78, Dutch politician and diplomat, Prime Minister (1982–1994), United Nations High Commissioner for Refugees (2001–2005).
Arthur J. Moss, 86, American cardiologist (University of Rochester).
John Pitman, 77, American journalist.
Bolla Bulli Ramaiah, 91, Indian politician.
Morgan Tsvangirai, 65, Zimbabwean politician and opposition leader, Prime Minister (2009–2013), colorectal cancer.
AnnMarie Wolpe, 87, South African feminist, sociologist and academic.

15
Abdilaqim Ademi, 48, Macedonian politician, MP (2002–2006) and Minister of Education and Science (since 2014).
Lassie Lou Ahern, 97, American actress (Our Gang, Uncle Tom's Cabin), complications from influenza.
Abdon Alinovi, 94, Italian politician, deputy (1976–1992).
Bibi Ballandi, 71, Italian television producer, colorectal cancer.
Tosun Bayrak, 92, Turkish writer and artist.
Ivar Belck-Olsen, 86, Norwegian politician.
Tom Brewer, 86, American baseball player (Boston Red Sox).
Don J. Briel, 71, American theologian, leukemia.
Leo Cahill, 89, American-Canadian football coach (Toronto Argonauts).
Pier Paolo Capponi, 79, Italian actor (The Cat o' Nine Tails).
Steven Collins, 66, British-born American Buddhist studies scholar.
Marian Czachor, 93, Polish footballer 
Jacques Hébert, 97, French politician, Mayor of Cherbourg (1958–1977), Deputy (1962–1973).
Geoff Jones, 87, Australian football player (St Kilda).
Chuck Klausing, 92, American football player (Penn State) and Hall of Fame coach (IUP, Carnegie Mellon).
Milan Křížek, 91, Czech composer.
Iseabail Macleod, 81, Scottish lexicographer.
Gian Paolo Mele, 73, Italian composer, choral director and musicologist.
Samuel Mpasu, 72, Malawian politician and author, Speaker of the National Assembly (1999–2003), hypertension.
Tamara Nizhnikova, 92, Belarusian singer, People's Artist of the USSR (1964).
J. Clay Smith Jr., 75, American jurist and author, chairman of the EEOC, complications from Alzheimer's disease.
Daniel Vernet, 72, French journalist and author, heart attack.

16
Napoleon Abueva, 88, Filipino sculptor, National Artist for Visual Arts.
Constance Bapela, South African politician, heart attack.
Reidar Berg, 93, Norwegian Olympic bobsledder (1948).
Jim Bridwell, 73, American free climber, complications from hepatitis C.
Little Sammy Davis, 89, American blues singer-songwriter and harmonicist.
Hubert Doggart, 92, English cricketer (Cambridge, Sussex, national team).
Charles W. Eriksen, 95, American psychologist.
Kikuko Inoue, 93, Japanese Olympic equestrian.
Heli Lääts, 85, Estonian singer.
Eleanor Winsor Leach, 80, American academic.
Gochomu J. Mudzingwa, 101, Zimbabwean traditional ruler, Chief Wozhele (since 2008), pneumonia.
Harry R. Purkey, 83, American politician, member of the Virginia House of Delegates (1986–2014).
Hans Rinner, 54, Austrian football official, President of Bundesliga (since 2009), cancer.
Alexander Sevastian, 41, Russian-born Canadian accordionist, heart attack.
Miroslav Šlouf, 69, Czech lobbyist (Lukoil), cirrhosis.
Greg Smyth, 51, Canadian ice hockey player (Quebec Nordiques, Philadelphia Flyers, Calgary Flames), cancer.
Deryck Stapleton, 100, British Royal Air Force officer.
Osvaldo Suárez, 83, Argentine Olympic long-distance runner (1960, 1964), Pan-American Games champion (1955, 1959, 1963).
Mike Walker, 72, American gossip columnist (National Enquirer).
Jayadeva Yogendra, 88, Indian yoga guru.

17
Ya'akov Ben-Yezri, 90, Moroccan-born Israeli politician, member of Knesset (2006–2009) and Minister of Health (2006–2009).
Martin Buvik, 95, Norwegian politician, MP (1965–1977).
Blas Calzada Terrados, 80, Spanish economist, Chairman of INE (1977–1979) and President of CNMV (2001–2004), stomach cancer.
Silvio Conrado, 72, Nicaraguan economist and banker, cardiac arrest.
Jacques Deslauriers, 89, Canadian ice hockey player (Montreal Canadiens).
Jim Dickey, 83, American football coach (Kansas State).
Beebe Freitas, 79, American pianist and vocal coach.
Akinwunmi Isola, 78, Nigerian playwright and actor.
Boyd Jarvis, 59, American music producer (Herbie Hancock, La Toya Jackson, Johnny Kemp), cancer.
Emmanuele Kanyama, 55, Malawian Roman Catholic prelate, Bishop of Dedza (since 2007), complications from diabetes.
Kenneth Kester, 81, American politician, member of the Colorado House of Representatives (1998–2002) and Colorado Senate (2003–2011).
Vasily Krylov, 71, Russian biologist.
Gumercindo España Olivares, 83, Mexican toymaker.
Miguel Pacheco, 86, Spanish racing cyclist.
Peder Persson, 79, Swedish footballer.
Mikey Post, 35, American actor (Pair of Kings), complications from amyotrophic lateral sclerosis.
Dorothy Rungeling, 106, Canadian aviation pioneer.
Rapee Sagarik, 95, Thai orchidologist.
Mohamed Shahabuddeen, 86, Guyanese politician and judge (International Court of Justice, Yugoslavia tribunal, International Criminal Court), Vice President (1983–1988).
Sampie Terreblanche, 84, South African economist and writer, brain cancer.
Gerald Weiß, 58, German Olympic javelin thrower (1988).

18
Rein Ahas, 51, Estonian geographer, heart attack.
Abbas Alasgarov, 80, Azerbaijani civil engineer and politician.
Günter Blobel, 81, German-born American biologist, Nobel Prize laureate (1999), cancer.
Peggy Cooper Cafritz, 70, American social activist and educator, co-founder of the Duke Ellington School of the Arts, complications from pneumonia.
José Luis Elejalde, 67, Cuban footballer (FC La Habana).
Victor Franco, 87, French journalist.
Sonia Graham, 88, British actress (Compact, London's Burning, One by One).
Peirce F. Lewis, 90, American geographer.
Didier Lockwood, 62, French jazz violinist, heart attack.
Larry Lolley, 72, American state judge, member of the Louisiana Circuit Courts of Appeal (2003–2017).
Georgi Markov, 46, Bulgarian footballer (Lokomotiv Sofia, Levski Sofia, Botev Plovdiv), heart attack.
John David Morley, 70, English writer and journalist.
Nazif Mujić, 47, Bosnian actor (An Episode in the Life of an Iron Picker).
Kandiah Neelakandan, 70, Sri Lankan lawyer.
Idrissa Ouédraogo, 64, Burkinabé film director.
Pavel Panov, 67, Bulgarian football player and coach (Levski Sofia, Aris, national team).
Lee Harris Pomeroy, 85, American architect.
K. S. Puttannaiah, 68, Indian politician, MLA for Pandavapura (1994–1999) and Melukote (since 2013), heart attack.
Elmar Rojas, 75, Guatemalan artist.
Eido Tai Shimano, 85, Japanese Buddhist monk.
Ivor Smith, 92, British architect (Park Hill).
Heiner Stadler, 75, German jazz musician and producer.
Chinedu Udoji, 28, Nigerian footballer (Enyimba, Kano Pillars), traffic collision.
Barbara Wersba, 85, American youth writer (Tunes for a Small Harmonica).

19
Hernán Alzamora, 90, Peruvian Olympic hurdler (1948).
Judy Blame, 58, English stylist and art director.
Harry Blevins, 82, American politician, member of the Virginia House of Delegates (1998–2001) and Senate (2001–2013).
Fred Carr, 71, American football player (Green Bay Packers), dementia and prostate cancer.
Max Desfor, 104, American photographer (Associated Press), Pulitzer Prize winner (1951).
Jean-Paul Faber, 87, French Olympic sports shooter.
Teresa Gisbert Carbonell, 91, Bolivian architect and art historian.
Gundu Hanumantha Rao, 61, Indian actor and comedian.
Floros Konstantinou, 65, Greek politician, economist and historian, Member of the Parliament of the Hellenes (1981–1996, 2000–2004).
Sergei Litvinov, 60, Russian hammer thrower, Olympic champion (1988) and silver medalist (1980), world champion (1983, 1987), heart attack.
Thomas Lockhart, 82, American politician, member of the Wyoming House of Representatives (2001–2017).
Robert McKim, 72, American politician, member of the Wyoming House of Representatives (2009–2017).
Necton Mhura, 61, Malawian diplomat, Ambassador to the United Nations (since 2016) and the United States (2015–2016), cancer.
Catherine Nevin, 67, Irish murderer, brain tumour.
Sir John Orr, 72, British police officer.
Daniel Peredo, 48, Peruvian sports journalist, heart attack.
Geoff Pimblett, 73, British rugby league player (England, St Helens R.F.C., Lancashire).
Charles Pence Slichter, 94, American physicist.
Larry Smith, 79, American puppeteer.
Jim Springer, 91, American basketball player (Indianapolis Jets, Bridgeport Roesslers).
Sir Peter Squire, 72, British Royal Air Force officer, Chief of the Air Staff (2000–2003).
Stormin, 34, British grime musician, skin cancer.
Sabah Tani, 49, Bangladeshi singer, low blood pressure.
Yuriy Tyukalov, 87, Russian rower, Olympic champion (1952, 1956).
Zhang Junsheng, 81, Chinese politician and academic, cardiac arrest.

20
David Barons, 81, British racehorse trainer.
Sonja Bata, 91, Swiss shoe museum curator and philanthropist.
*Lucien Bouchardeau, 56, Nigerien football referee, heart failure.
John Boyd, 92, Scottish milliner.
David Caron, 65, American legal scholar.
Jiichiro Date, 66, Japanese wrestler, Olympic champion (1976).
Herbert Ehrenberg, 91, German politician, Minister of Labour and Social Affairs (1976–1982).
William H. Friedland, 94, American rural sociologist.
Arnaud Geyre, 82, French racing cyclist, Olympic champion (1956).
B. K. Goyal, 82, Indian cardiologist, cardiac arrest.
DeWitt Hale, 100, American politician, Member of the Texas House of Representatives (1939–1940, 1953–1978).
Joe Hung, 86, Taiwanese journalist (Central News Agency) and diplomat, Representative to Italy (1993–2000), heart and lung disease.
Tōta Kaneko, 98, Japanese writer.
Agnieszka Kotulanka, 61, Polish actress.
Lionel March, 84, British mathematician, architect and digital artist.
Howard McCurdy, 85, Canadian politician, MP for Windsor—Walkerville (1984–1988) and Windsor—Tecumseh (1988–1993), cancer.
Roy McDonald, 80, Canadian poet, author and musician.
Sir Donald Murray, 95, Northern Irish jurist.
Andrew Ranicki, 69, British mathematician, leukaemia.
Irene Strong, 88, Canadian Olympic swimmer (1948, 1952).
Waldo R. Tobler, 87, American geographer and cartographer.
Zigmas Zinkevičius, 93, Lithuanian linguist-historian.

21
Valentin Afraimovich, 72, Russian mathematician.
Ian Aitken, 90, British journalist and political commentator.
Sergei Aleksandrov, 44, Russian footballer (Orenburg, Luch Vladivostok).
Arthur Black, 74, Canadian radio broadcaster (CBC), pancreatic cancer.
Lawrence D. Brown, 77, American statistician.
Thomas M. Carsey, 52, American political scientist, complications from amyotrophic lateral sclerosis.
Emma Chambers, 53, English actress (The Vicar of Dibley, Notting Hill, How Do You Want Me?), heart attack.
Kalyan Singh Chauhan, 58, Indian politician, MLA for Nathdwara (since 2008), cancer.
Chow Chee Keong, 69, Malaysian footballer (national team), bladder cancer.
John Cribb, 67, Australian triple murderer and rapist.
Zelda D'Aprano, 90, Australian political activist.
Harriet Fier, 67, American magazine and newspaper editor (Rolling Stone, The Washington Post), breast cancer.
Beryl Fletcher, 79, New Zealand novelist.
Billy Graham, 99, American evangelist and Southern Baptist minister.
Kurt Hansen, 90, footballer 
Taïeb Louhichi, 69, Tunisian film director (Shadow of the Earth).
Betty Miller, 91, American aviator, first female pilot to fly solo across the Pacific Ocean.
Ren Osugi, 66, Japanese actor, heart failure.
John R. Schmidhauser, 96, American politician, member of the U. S. House of Representatives from Iowa's 1st congressional district (1965–1967).
Lokendra Singh, 41, Indian politician, MLA for Noorpur (since 2012), traffic collision.
Giuseppe Turini, 90, Italian politician, Senator (1992–2001).

22
Marilyn Fain Apseloff, 83, American children's writer.
Errol Buddle, 89, Australian jazz musician.
Serban Cantacuzino, 89, Romanian architect.
Nanette Fabray, 97, American actress and singer (High Button Shoes, Caesar's Hour, One Day at a Time), Tony (1949) and Emmy Award-winner (1956, 1957).
Valentin Falin, 91, Russian Soviet-era diplomat and politician.
Forges, 76, Spanish cartoonist (El Jueves, Diario 16, El País), pancreatic cancer.
Billi Gordon, 63, American actor, model and neuroscientist.
Euler Granda, 82, Ecuadorian poet, writer and psychiatrist.
Jack Hamilton, 79, American baseball player (Philadelphia Phillies, California Angels, New York Mets).
Bette Henritze, 93, American actress (The Hospital, The World According to Garp, Other People's Money).
Peter Kocot, 61, American politician, member of the Massachusetts House of Representatives (since 2002).
Bence Lázár, 26, Hungarian footballer (Újpest FC, SV Würmla), leukemia.
Li Ching, 69, Hong Kong actress. (body discovered on this date)
Gladys Maccabe, 99, Northern Irish artist.
William Serrin, 78, American journalist (Detroit Free Press), winner of Pulitzer Prize (1968), heart attack.
László Tahi Tóth, 74, Hungarian actor, stroke.
Richard E. Taylor, 88, Canadian physicist, Nobel Prize laureate (1990).
Billy Wilson, 71, English footballer (Blackburn Rovers, Portsmouth).

23
Dom Anile, 80, American football coach and executive (Indianapolis Colts).
James Colby, 56, American actor (Patriots Day, Tower Heist, Empire).
Graeme Gahan, 76, Australian footballer (Richmond).
Ali Teoman Germaner, 83–84, Turkish sculptor.
Lewis Gilbert, 97, British film director (You Only Live Twice, Alfie, Educating Rita).
James Laxer, 76, Canadian political economist.
Donovan McClelland, 69, Northern Irish politician.
Saichiro Misumi, 101, Japanese indologist.
Allen B. Rosenstein, 97, American systems engineer.
Celal Şahin, 92, Turkish musician and actor.
Sir Kenneth Scott, 87, British diplomat and courtier.
Teddi Siddall, 64, American actress.
Jesus Varela, 90, Filipino Roman Catholic prelate, Bishop of Sorsogon (1980–2003).
Wolfhart Westendorf, 93, German Egyptologist.

24
Getulio Alviani, 78, Italian painter.
Kalman Aron, 93, Holocaust survivor and artist.
Shmuel Auerbach, 86, Israeli Haredi rabbi, heart disease.
Eitan Avitsur, 76, Israeli composer and conductor.
Judith Baxter, 62–63, British sociolinguist.
Irwin Belk, 95, American politician, philanthropist and retail executive (Belk), member of the North Carolina Senate (1963–1966) and House of Representatives (1959–1962).
Wim Claes, 56, Belgian composer, songwriter and music producer.
Sir Durward Knowles, 100, Bahamian sailor, Olympic champion (1964), kidney failure.
Ed Leede, 90, American basketball player (Boston Celtics).
Bud Luckey, 83, American animator and voice actor (Toy Story, Boundin', Winnie the Pooh).
James McIntosh, 87, American rower, Olympic silver medalist (1956).
Folco Quilici, 87, Italian film director and screenwriter.
Bhanu Kumar Shastri, 92, Indian politician.
Sridevi, 54, Indian actress (English Vinglish), accidental drowning.
Óscar Julio Vian Morales, 70, Guatemalan Roman Catholic prelate, Archbishop of Santiago de Guatemala (since 2010), cancer.
Charles Byron Wilson, 88, American neurosurgeon, heart disease.
Yang Rudai, 91, Chinese politician, member of the Politburo of the Communist Party of China.

25
Urban Bowman, 80, American-Canadian football coach (Winnipeg Blue Bombers, Hamilton Tiger Cats), prostate cancer.
Max Cole, 77, Australian football player (Fitzroy).
Dai Fudong, 89, Chinese architect, member of the Chinese Academy of Engineering.
Dan Fegan, 56, American basketball agent (DeMarcus Cousins, John Wall, Ricky Rubio), traffic collision.
Danny Florencio, 70, Filipino basketball player (Toyota, Crispa, U/Tex), heart attack.
Ainsley Gotto, 72, Australian political secretary and interior designer, cancer.
Michael Green, 91, British journalist and writer. 
Cynthia Heimel, 70, American columnist, author and humorist, complications from dementia.
Richard Hundley, 86, American pianist and composer.
Branko Kubala, 69, Czechoslovak-born Spanish footballer (RCD Espanyol, Dallas Tornado).
Burton Leland, 69, American politician, member of the Michigan Senate (1999–2006) and House of Representatives (1981–1998), cancer.
Leif Liljeroth, 93, Swedish actor.
John C. Mula, 75, American art director and production designer (Barney Miller, Charles in Charge, Dinosaurs).
Nev Pask, 87, Australian property developer.
Ram Punjabi, 89, Indian cricket umpire.
Ola Thorleif Ruud, 91, Norwegian politician.
Frank Sander, 90, American law professor.
Noel Scott, 88, New Zealand politician, MP for Tongariro (1984–1990).
Bruce Nelson Stratton, 74, American radio personality (WPLO), throat cancer.
Scott Westgarth, 31, British boxer, injuries sustained in match.
Tsvetan Veselinov, 70, Bulgarian footballer (Levski Sofia, national team), Olympic silver medalist (1968).
Penny Vincenzi, 78, British writer.

26
Joseph Achuzie, 88–89, Nigerian politician and secessionist Biafran military commander.
Sir Richard Body, 90, English politician, MP for Boston and Skegness (1966–2001) and Billericay (1955–1959). 
Ernest Bohr, 93, Danish lawyer and Olympic field hockey player (1948).
Mies Bouwman, 88, Dutch television presenter, pneumonia.
Patrick Cusick, 98, American civil engineer and city planner, Executive Director of the Pittsburgh Regional Planning Association (1957–1964).
*Paul De Meo, 64, American screenwriter and producer (The Rocketeer, Trancers, The Flash).
Jim Dobson, 78, American baseball player.
Alan Geldard, 90, British cyclist, Olympic bronze medalist (1948).
Jim L. Gillis Jr., 101, American politician.
Juan Hidalgo Codorniu, 90, Spanish composer.
Sir Paul Jenkins, 63, British lawyer, Treasury Solicitor (2006–2014).
Mariadas Kagithapu, 81, Indian Roman Catholic prelate, Archbishop of Visakhapatnam (1982–2012).
Tatyana Karpova, 102, Russian actress, People's Artist of the USSR (1990).
Sean Lavery, 61, American ballet dancer (New York City Ballet).
Li Boguang, 49, Chinese legal scholar and human rights activist, liver cancer.
Giorgi Maisashvili, 55, Georgian economist and politician, cancer.
Benjamin Melniker, 104, American film producer (Batman, Constantine, National Treasure).
Peter Miles, 89, English actor (Z-Cars, Doctor Who, Blake's 7).
Carmen A. Orechio, 91, American politician, member of the New Jersey Senate (1974–1992).
Thomas Pernes, 62, Austrian avant-garde composer.
Michael J. Pikal, 78, American pharmaceutical scientist.
Gary H. Posner, 74, American chemist, Parkinson's disease.
Veljko Rus, 88, Slovenian sociologist.
T. S. R. Subramanian, 79, Indian civil servant, Cabinet Secretary (1996–1998), chancellor of Shiv Nadar University.
Muriel Turner, Baroness Turner of Camden, 90, British politician.

27
Gertrude Alderfer, 86, American baseball player (AAGPBL).
Joseph Bagobiri, 60, Nigerian Roman Catholic prelate, Bishop of Kafanchan (since 1995).
Albert Benschop, 68, Dutch sociologist.
William H. T. Bush, 79, American venture capitalist and financier.
Lance Clark, 81, British shoemaker (Clarks).
Gabriel Cruz, 8, Spanish boy, suffocated.
Steve Folkes, 59, Australian rugby league player (Canterbury Bulldogs, Hull FC, New South Wales), heart attack.
Makoto Hirayama, 65, Japanese politician.
M. Jaishankar, 41, Indian serial killer and rapist, suicide by throat-cutting.
Henri Leonetti, 81, French footballer (Marseille).
Bill Lignante, 91, American comics artist.
Luciano Benjamín Menéndez, 90, Argentine military officer, convicted murderer and human rights violator, cardiogenic shock.
Keith Murdoch, 74, New Zealand rugby union player (Otago, national team).
Daniel Perlsweig, 91, American racehorse trainer (Lord Avie), awarded Dogwood Dominion Award (1993).
Prabodh Panda, 72, Indian politician, heart attack.
Quini, 68, Spanish footballer (Sporting de Gijón, F.C Barcelona, national team), heart attack.
Hugo Santiago, 78, Argentine film director (Invasión, Écoute voir, The Others) and actor.
Jacqueline Vaudecrane, 104, French figure skater.
Jan Vercruysse, 69, Belgian artist.

28
Chen Xiaolu, 71, Chinese businessman and princeling, heart attack.
Barry Crimmins, 64, American comedian and social activist, cancer.
Amand Dalem, 79, Belgian politician, Mayor of Rochefort (1970–1994), Senator (1979–1994), Minister of the Walloon Government (1985–1992), Governor of Namur (1994-2007).
Kieron Durkan, 44, English footballer (Wrexham, Stockport County, Macclesfield Town).
Keith English, 50, American politician, member of the Missouri House of Representatives (2013–2017), suicide by gunshot.
Antonio García-Trevijano, 90, Spanish lawyer, politician, philosopher and anti-Francoist activist.
Rogelio Guerra, 81, Mexican actor (Mañana es para siempre, Rafaela, Amor Bravío), complications from thrombus.
Jeff Kowalick, 71, Australian cricketer.
Stefán Kristjánsson, 35, Icelandic chess grandmaster.
Andy Lewis, 92, American screenwriter (Klute).
Lye Siew Weng, 77, Malaysian politician, MLA for Air Itam (1995–2004) and Air Putih (2004–2008), bone cancer.
Marc L. Marks, 91, American politician, member of the U.S. House of Representatives for Pennsylvania's 24th district (1977–1983).
Pierre Milza, 85, French historian.
Albert Mkrtchyan, 81, Armenian theater director, film director, actor, screenwriter.
John Muir, 70, Scottish footballer (St Johnstone, Alloa).
Ratnavel Pandian, 89, Indian judge, member of the Supreme Court (1988–1994), chief justice of Madras High Court (1988).
Jayendra Saraswathi, 82, Indian guru, seer of Kanchi Kamakoti Peetham (since 1954).
Gerhard Scherhorn, 88, German economist.
Harvey Schmidt, 88, American musical theatre producer and writer (The Fantasticks, 110 in the Shade).
Naomi Siegmann, 84–85, American artist, pneumonia.
Ștefan Tașnadi, 64, Romanian weightlifter, Olympic silver medalist (1984).
William R. Trotter, 74, American author and historian.
Noble Villeneuve, 79, Canadian politician, MPP (1983–1999).
Gjert Wilhelmsen, 91, Norwegian shipowner.

References

2018-02
 02